De Machometo ('On Muḥammad') is a brief anonymous Latin tract on the life of Muḥammad from a Christian point of view. It begins in the reign of Pope Boniface IV (608–615). Its account is cobbled together from a variety of sources, including the fifth dialogue of Petrus Alphonsi's Dialogi in quibus impiae Judaeorum confutantur, the Corozan legend and possibly the Libellus in partibus transmarinis de Machometi fallaciis from Vincent of Beauvais's Speculum historiale. The composite account is very similar to the account of Muḥammad found in the Golden Legend.

It is known from at least four manuscripts:
Copenhagen, Royal Danish Library, Acc. 2011/5, ff. 193r–194r (pp. 379–381), from the late 14th century
Cambridge, University Library, MS Dd.1.17, ff. 79rb–79rv (incomplete), from 
London, British Library, MS Royal 13.E.IX, ff. 93r–94r, from  1395–1425
London, British Library, MS Sloane 289, ff. 92v–95v, from the mid-15th century

De Machometo follows William of Tripoli's De statu Sarracenorum in both the Copenhagen and Cambridge manuscripts. The text has never been edited.

Notes

Bibliography

Biographies of Muhammad
Medieval Latin texts